María Noelia Bermúdez Valverde (born 20 September 1994), known as Noelia Bermúdez, is a Costa Rican footballer who plays as a goalkeeper for Spanish Primera División club Deportivo La Coruña and the Costa Rica women's national team.

Club career
Bermúdez signed for Spanish Primera División club Levante UD in January 2016. Six months and 15 league appearances later she was voted 2015–16 Goalkeeper of the Year in Spain. In 2017, Bermúdez joined Valencia CF.

Personal life
Bermúdez is openly lesbian.

References

External links
 
 Profile  at Fedefutbol
 

1994 births
Living people
Women's association football goalkeepers
Costa Rican women's footballers
People from San Carlos (canton)
Costa Rica women's international footballers
2015 FIFA Women's World Cup players
Pan American Games bronze medalists for Costa Rica
Pan American Games medalists in football
Footballers at the 2019 Pan American Games
Primera División (women) players
Levante UD Femenino players
Valencia CF Femenino players
Costa Rican expatriate footballers
Costa Rican expatriate sportspeople in Spain
Expatriate women's footballers in Spain
Deportivo de La Coruña (women) players
Lesbian sportswomen
LGBT association football players
Costa Rican LGBT people
Medalists at the 2019 Pan American Games